The Colla or Kolla language may be either:
The Aymara language or
Any of several neighboring dialects of Quechua, such as South Bolivian Quechua.

See also
Kolla people